, also called ,  and , is a complex Shinto shrine structure in which the haiden, or worship hall, and the honden, or main sanctuary, are interconnected under the same roof in the shape of an H. 

The floor of each of the three halls can be at a different level. If the ai-no-ma is paved with stones it is called ishi-no-ma, whence the name of the style. It can, however, be paved with planks or tatami. Its width is often the same as the honden's, with the haiden from one to three ken wider.

This style, rather than the structure of a building, defines the relationship between member structures of a shrine. Each member then belongs to a particular architectural style. Because they are connected by a passage called ishi-no-ma and are covered by a single roof, however, the complex is classified as belonging to the ishi-no-ma-zukuri style.

One of the oldest examples is Kitano Tenman-gū in Kyoto. The gongen-zukuri name comes from Nikkō Tōshō-gū in Nikkō, which enshrines the Tōshō Daigongen (Tokugawa Ieyasu) and adopts this structure.

See also
 Shinto architecture
 Glossary of Shinto

Notes

Shinto architecture
Gongen